Oglander is a surname, and may refer to:

Sir Henry Oglander, 7th Baronet (1811–1874)
John Oglander (1585–1655), English politician and diarist
Sir William Oglander, 1st Baronet (c.1611–1670)
Sir William Oglander, 6th Baronet (1769–1852)
Oglander baronets

External links
Stirnet: Oglander1